Ferenc Kónya (9 December 1892 – 11 March 1977), also known as Franz Konya and François Konya, was a Hungarian football player and coach.

Playing career
Kónya played for Kispesti AC.

Coaching career
Kónya managed 1. FC Kaiserslautern, SV Werder Bremen, Estonia, Modena, FC Olten, FC Luzern and Caen.

References

1892 births
1977 deaths
Hungarian footballers
Association football forwards
Budapest Honvéd FC players
Hungarian football managers
1. FC Kaiserslautern managers
SV Werder Bremen managers
Estonia national football team managers
Hungarian expatriate football managers
Expatriate football managers in Switzerland
Modena F.C. managers
FC Luzern managers
Stade Malherbe Caen managers
Footballers from Budapest
People from the Kingdom of Hungary
Expatriate football managers in Estonia